Colonel Stephen Terrell OBE TD DL QC (15 June 1916 – 16 August 2004), was a British barrister and Liberal Party politician.

Background
He was educated at Trinity College, Glenalmond and University College, London. In 1951 he married Diana Marion Hartwell. They had two sons. He was awarded the OBE in 1952.

Professional career
He was Called to the Bar by Gray's Inn in 1946. In 1965 he took silk. He became a Bencher at Gray's Inn in 1970. He was appointed a Deputy Lieutenant for Middlesex and then in 1961 for Greater London.

Political career
He was Liberal candidate for the Eastbourne division of Sussex at the 1964 General Election. He was elected to the Liberal party national executive. He was Chairman of the Liberal's Home Office panel. He contested Eastbourne again in 1966, 1970 and February 1974 general elections, each time without success. He served as President of the Liberal Party from 1971 to 1972. After failing to win Eastbourne for the fourth time, he did not stand for parliament again.

Electoral record

References

1916 births
2004 deaths
Liberal Party (UK) parliamentary candidates
People educated at Glenalmond College
Alumni of University College London
Members of Gray's Inn